Al-Ahrar is a subdistrict of the An Numaniyah district in the Wasit Governorate of Iraq, on the west bank of the Tigris. Its seat is the town of the Ahrar.
The subdistrict was established in 1961, and covers 1244 square km. Farming is the main occupation in Al-Ahrar subdistrict due to irrigated alluvial soil. It is famous for production of wheat, rice and date palm.

Ahdab oil field
Ahdab oil field lies in a 303 square km in Al-Ahrar subdistrict. Iraqi's official sources estimated the oilfield's reserves 1 billion barrel. A contract to develop Ahdab oil field was signed between Saddam Hussein's regime and CNPC in 1996, but the deal delayed after UN imposed sanctions and postponed further by the Iraq War. The work commenced in 2008 and the production begun 2011 with 60,000 barrels per day, increasing to 140,000 barrel the next year.

Ahdab oilfield is a joint project between CNPC (75%) and South Oil Company (25%).

Ubaydah Bin Al Jarrah Air Base
Ubaydah Bin Al Jarrah Air Base is a main Iraqi airbase located in the southern part of the Al-Ahrar subdistrict, built by Yugoslavian companies during 1980s. Air base played a key role during the Iran–Iraq War for its location near Iranian–Iraqi borders. Airbase consists of runway, taxiways, and 200 hardened aircraft shelters accommodate 3 squadrons of Su-20/22s and a squadron of MiG-21s and MiG-23s for air defence.

References

Populated places in Wasit Governorate
Subdistricts of Iraq